Cynthia A. Montgomery is an American economist and academic, teaching strategy the Timken Professor of Business Administration at Harvard Business School. Prior to Harvard, Montgomery was on the faculty of the University of Michigan Ross School of Business and at Northwestern's Kellogg School of Management.

Books

 Montgomery, Cynthia A. The Strategist: Be the Leader Your Business Needs. New York: HarperCollins, 2012.  
 Collis, David J., and Cynthia A. Montgomery. Corporate Strategy: A Resource-Based Approach. 2nd ed. Boston: McGraw-Hill/Irwin, 2005. 
 Collis, D. J., and C. A. Montgomery. Corporate Strategy: Resources and the Scope of the Firm. IL: Irwin, 1997.  
 Montgomery, C. A., ed. Resource-Based and Evolutionary Theories of the Firm: Towards a Synthesis. Norwell, MA: Kluwer Academic Publishers, 1995. 
 Montgomery, C. A. and M. E. Porter, eds. Strategy: Seeking and Securing Competitive Advantage. Boston, MA: Harvard Business School Press, 1991.

References

Year of birth missing (living people)
Living people
Harvard Business School faculty
American women economists
21st-century American economists
21st-century American women